Chondrocladia turbiformis is a recently discovered species of carnivorous sponge.

References

Animals described in 2009
turbiformis